The Oregon Army National Guard is a federally mandated and equipped military organization under the civilian direction of the Oregon Military Department, with the Governor of Oregon as its Commander-in-Chief. It responds to state and national emergencies, military conflicts and natural disasters, and conducts search and rescue operations. While the history of the militia dates back to the establishment of the first Oregon militia in 1843, the present Guard was not established until after 1903. The modern Guard includes citizen soldiers, and its motto is "When we are needed, we are there."

The Oregon Army National Guard consists of 41 armories in 33 communities.

Units 
The current units and structure of the guard is;
Oregon Army National Guard Headquarters and Headquarters Detachment, in Salem, Oregon
249th Regiment, in Hermiston, Oregon
102nd Civil Support Team, in Salem, Oregon
4133rd Judge Advocate General's Detachment, in Salem, Oregon
Detachment, 653rd Judge Advocate General Detachment
234th Army Band, at Camp Withycombe
41st Infantry Brigade Combat Team
Brigade Headquarters and Headquarters Company, at Camp Withycombe
1st Squadron, 82nd Cavalry Regiment, in Bend, Oregon
Headquarters and Headquarters Troop
A Troop, in Albany, Oregon
B Troop, in Redmond, Oregon
C Troop, in Klamath Falls, Oregon
D Company, 141st Bridge Support Battalion (attached)
Detachment 1, in Burns, Oregon
2nd Battalion, 162nd Infantry Regiment, in Springfield, Oregon
Headquarters and Headquarters Company
A Company
B Company, in Corvallis, Oregon
C Company, in Gresham, Oregon
D Company, in Clackamas, Oregon
E Company, 141st Brigade Support Battalion (attached)
1st Battalion, 186th Infantry Regiment, in Ashland, Oregon
Headquarters and Headquarters Company
A Company, in Medford, Oregon
B Company, in Coos Bay, Oregon
Detachment 1, in St. Helens, Oregon
C Company, in Roseburg, Oregon
D Company, in Grants Pass, Oregon
F Company, 141st Brigade Support Battalion (attached)
2nd Battalion, 218th Field Artillery Regiment, in Forest Grove, Oregon
Headquarters and Headquarters Battery
A Battery, in Portland, Oregon
B Battery, in McMinnville, Oregon
C Battery, in Portland, Oregon
D Battery, in Salem, Oregon
F Company, 141st Brigade Support Battalion Forest Grove, Oregon (attached)
141st Brigade Support Battalion, in Portland, Oregon
Headquarters and Headquarters Company
A Company
B Company
C Company
D Company, in Bend, Oregon
Detachment 1, in Burns, Oregon
E Company, in Springfield, Oregon
F Company, in Medford, Oregon
Detachment 1, in Coos Bay, Oregon
G Company, in Forest Grove, Oregon
Special Troops Battalion, at Camp Withycombe
Headquarters and Headquarters Company
A Company
B Company
C Company
82nd Troop Command
Command Headquarters at Camp Withycombe
3rd Battalion, 116th Cavalry Regiment (part of 116th Cavalry Brigade Combat Team, Idaho Army National Guard)
Headquarters and Headquarters Company, in La Grande, Oregon
Detachment 1, in Pendleton, Oregon
Detachment 2, in Hood River, Oregon
A Company, in The Dalles, Oregon
Detachment 1, in Hermiston, Oregon
B Company, in Woodburn, Oregon
C Company, in Ontario, Oregon
D Company, in Hermiston, Oregon
F Company, 145th Brigade Support Battalion (attached), in Baker City, Oregon
Detachment 1, in La Grande, Oregon
Detachment 2, in Hood River, Oregon
1249th Engineer Battalion, in Salem, Oregon
Headquarters and Headquarters Company
Forward Support Company
162nd Engineer Company, in Dallas, Oregon
224th Engineer Company, in Albany, Oregon
Detachment 1, in Newport, Oregon
234th Engineer Company, at Camp Rilea
2nd Battalion, 641st Aviation Regiment, in Salem, Oregon
Headquarters and Headquarters Company
A Company
Detachment 47, Operational Support Airlift Command
821st Troop Command
Command Headquarters, in Salem, Oregon
1186th Military Police Company
Detachment 1 in Milton-Freewater, Oregon
115th Public Affairs Detachment

History
Oregon Army National Guard soldiers have been deployed to Afghanistan, ranging from 9 months to more than a year. Some provided security in Afghanistan during the drawdown of troops. Others with an engineer battalion worked on soldier housing in Kuwait and U.S. military facilities in Kuwait, Jordan, Iraq and Afghanistan.

Historic units
 82nd Armor
 162nd Infantry Regiment
 186th Infantry Regiment
 218th Field Artillery Regiment – Perpetuated the Portland Light Artillery Battery organized in 1866, Oregon's oldest continuously active National Guard unit and the oldest continuously active National Guard unit west of the Mississippi. Split into 218th and 2nd Battalion, 204th Field Artillery 1942; the latter became the 965th Field Artillery Battalion in 1943.
 249th Coast Artillery Regiment – Split into 171st and 249th Coast Artillery Battalions 18 October 1944 during World War II. 
1st Battalion, 249th Infantry (1980–1993) – HHD Newberg, separate TOW battalion.
 641st Military Intelligence Battalion
 641st Medical Battalion
 741st Corps Support Battalion
 249th Artillery Group (Air Defense) (1959–1971)
 1st Automatic Weapons Battalion, 249th Artillery (1959–1963) – Converted to 2nd Battalion, 303rd Armor 1963, consolidated with 2nd Battalion, 186th Infantry to become 3rd Squadron, 163rd Armored Cavalry
 2nd Automatic Weapons Battalion, 249th Artillery (1959–1968)
 3rd Gun Battalion, 249th Artillery (1959–1961) – Reorganized as 3rd Automatic Weapons Battalion, 249th Artillery 1961, then 3rd Battalion, 249th Artillery 1965, converted to 1249th Engineer Battalion 1971
 162nd Engineer Battalion (1947–1965)
 218th Field Artillery Battalion (1947–1959) – Continued lineage of World War II 218th Field Artillery Battalion, formed after the 218th Field Artillery was split. Lineage continued by 218th Artillery 1959.
 965th Field Artillery Battalion (1949–1959) – Continued lineage of World War II 965th Field Artillery Battalion, formed after the 218th Field Artillery was split. Lineage continued by 218th Artillery 1959. 
 237th Antiaircraft Artillery Group (1948–1959)
 722nd Antiaircraft Artillery Battalion (1947–1959) – Previously 249th Coast Artillery Battalion (Harbor Defense) and 1st Battalion, 249th Coast Artillery (Harbor Defense). Redesignated as 722nd Antiaircraft Artillery Gun Battalion 10 July 1946, reorganized and Federally recognized 31 January 1950 with HHC Portland and batteries at Portland, Redmond, Gresham and Salem. Reorganized and redesignated 16 July 1951 as 722nd Antiaircraft Artillery Automatic Weapons Battalion, redesignated 1 October 1953 as 722nd Antiaircraft Artillery Battalion (Automatic Weapons) (Self-Propelled) due to conversion to M51 Skysweeper. Lineage of unit perpetuated by 249th Artillery 1 April 1959 under Combat Arms Regimental System during Pentomic reorganization.
 732nd Antiaircraft Artillery Battalion (1947–1959) – Previously 171st Coast Artillery Battalion (Harbor Defense) and elements of the 249th Coast Artillery Regiment. Redesignated as 965th Field Artillery Battalion 10 July 1946, reorganized and Federally recognized with HQ Klamath Falls 13 November 1947. Redesignated as 732nd Antiaircraft Artillery Gun Battalion (90 mm), a unit originally allocated to Portland but never activated, 1 February 1949; a new 965th activated at Portland. HQ location changed to Ashland 12 May 1949. Reorganized and redesignated 16 July 1951 as 732nd Antiaircraft Artillery Automatic Weapons Battalion, redesignated 1 October 1953 as 732nd Antiaircraft Artillery Battalion (Automatic Weapons) (Self Propelled) due to conversion to M51 Skysweeper. Consolidated into 249th Artillery under Combat Arms Regimental System during Pentomic reorganization 1 April 1959.
3670th Ordnance Company – Organized 1947 at Portland, location changed to Camp Withycombe, Clackamas 1948. Redesignated 3670th Maintenance Company 1968, inactivated 2018.
110th Signal Company – Salem, became 1210th Transportation Company (Light Truck) 1968.

In popular culture
 Shepherds of Helmand

See also
 Oregon Civil Defense Force

References

Citations

Bibliography

External links
 
Bibliography of Oregon Army National Guard History compiled by the United States Army Center of Military History
Oregon National Guard web site

Salem, Oregon National Guard web site

Military in Oregon
Oregon
1903 establishments in Oregon